The Petuelpark is a  park situated in between Schwabing and Milbertshofen-Am Hart in Munich, Germany.

External links

Parks and open spaces in Munich
Milbertshofen-Am Hart